Carl Valentin Falsen (27 May 1787–14 April 1852) was a Norwegian civil servant, a county governor, and member of the Storting.

Biography
Falsen was born in Christiania, Norway. He was the son of Norwegian Chief Justice Enevold De Falsen (1755–1808) and Anna Henrike Petronelle Mathiesen (1762–1825). He was the brother of Christian Magnus Falsen.  Both his father and grandfather were senior justice officials. He was trained in the law and took his examination as a Candidate of Law  (cand. Jur.)  at the University of Copenhagen in 1806.

Falsen was the town clerk for Trondheim starting in 1809. He was hired as the town bailiff for Trondheim from 1821 until 1826. In 1826, he served as  the magistrate judge for Eiker, Sigdal, and Modum. In 1839, he was appointed county governor for Bratsberg county (now called Telemark). He served in that job until 1846 when he was transferred to a new job. From 1846 until 1852, he served as the county governor of Christianssand stiftamt as well as the county governor of Lister og Mandals amt (one of the subordinate counties).

Falsen was elected to the Norwegian Parliament in 1818 and 1821 as a representative from Trondheim, in 1830-1838 from Buskerud from 1842 and 1845 representing Bratsberg and 1848-1850 as representative from Kristiansand. He served as president of the Storting during 1833, 1845, and 1848.

Carl Falsen was honored as a knight of the Order of the Polar Star in 1822.  He was made a commander in the Order of St. Olav in 1847.

References

1787 births
1852 deaths
Civil servants from Oslo
Presidents of the Storting
University of Copenhagen alumni
Norwegian jurists
Politicians from Oslo
19th-century Norwegian politicians
Order of the Polar Star
County governors of Norway